Awadh Dental College and Hospital (ADCH) is a private dental college located in Jamshedpur, in the Indian state of Jharkhand. It is affiliated with the Kolhan University and is recognized by Dental Council of India. It offers Bachelor of Dental Science (BDS) and Master of Dental Science (MDS) courses.

References

Dental colleges in India
Colleges affiliated to Kolhan University
Universities and colleges in Jharkhand
Education in Jamshedpur
Hospitals in Jamshedpur